In physiology, isotropic bands (better known as I bands) are the lighter bands of skeletal muscle cells (a.k.a. muscle fibers). Isotropic bands contain only actin-containing thin filaments.

The darker bands are called anisotropic bands (A bands).  Together the I-bands and A-bands contribute to the striated appearance of skeletal muscle.

Isotropic bands indicate the behavior of polarized light as it passes through I bands.

Diagrams provide an indication of what I and A Bands look like, through a microscope.

References

Muscular system